Saint-Marcel is a commune in the Morbihan department of Brittany in north-western France.

Saint-Marcel houses the Museum of the Breton Resistance which commemorates the uprising of the Maquis of Saint-Marcel (3,000 fighters) and 200 Free French SAS parachutists in 18 June 1944, which the French force under command of Colonel Morice (Paul Chenailler), Free French Pierre Bourgoin and André Hue came under German attack.

See also
Communes of the Morbihan department

References

External links

 Mayors of Morbihan Association 

Saintmarcel